Ephebopus foliatus is a species of tarantula (family Theraphosidae) found in Guiana.

References 

Theraphosidae
Spiders described in 2008
Spiders of South America
Taxa named by Rick C. West